Sonnier is a surname. Notable people with the surname include:

Dallas Sonnier (born 1980), American film producer, publisher, and entrepreneur
Elmo Patrick Sonnier (1950–1984), American murderer and rapist
Floyd Sonnier (1933–2002), American Cajun artist
J. Bert Sonnier (born 1938), American thoroughbred trainer
Jo-El Sonnier (born 1946), American singer-songwriter and accordionist 
Keith Sonnier (1941–2020), American sculptor, performance artist, video and light artist